Zhang Xiaoling (born 20 July 1957) is a Chinese retired para table tennis player who won 12 Paralympic medals from 1988 to 2008.

She laboured as a sent-down youth during the Cultural Revolution. While toiling one day in 1973, she seriously sprained her right foot, which was subsequently amputated due to no timely treatment. In 1987, she won a gold medal at a national women's singles table tennis competition.

Zhang represented China for the first time at the 1988 Summer Paralympics in Seoul, and won gold in the open event. She competed in every subsequent edition of the Summer Paralympics, and won at least two medals – one in the singles event, one in the team event, and in 1992 and 1996 one in the open event – on every occasion. She represented China again at the 2008 Summer Paralympics in Beijing, but, for the first time, she only competed in the singles.

Notes

External links
 

1957 births
Chinese female table tennis players
Table tennis players at the 1988 Summer Paralympics
Table tennis players at the 1992 Summer Paralympics
Table tennis players at the 1996 Summer Paralympics
Table tennis players at the 2000 Summer Paralympics
Table tennis players at the 2004 Summer Paralympics
Table tennis players at the 2008 Summer Paralympics
Paralympic table tennis players of China
Medalists at the 1988 Summer Paralympics
Medalists at the 1992 Summer Paralympics
Medalists at the 1996 Summer Paralympics
Medalists at the 2000 Summer Paralympics
Medalists at the 2004 Summer Paralympics
Medalists at the 2008 Summer Paralympics
Paralympic medalists in table tennis
Paralympic gold medalists for China
Paralympic silver medalists for China
Paralympic bronze medalists for China
Table tennis players from Guangxi
Living people
People from Qinzhou
Chinese amputees
FESPIC Games competitors